Kennedia nigricans, commonly known as black kennedia, is a species of flowering plant in the family Fabaceae and is endemic to the south-west of Western Australia. It is a trailing or twining shrub or climber with trifoliate leaves and black and yellow-orange flowers.

Description
The lateral leaflets are smaller, on a short petiolule.

Taxonomy
Kennedia nigricans was first formally described in 1835 by John Lindley in Edwards's Botanical Register, where it was also labelled as  "Dingy-flowered Kennedya". The specific epithet (nigricans) means "blackish".

Distribution and habitat
Black kennedia grows on coastal dunes, on creek margins and on flats in the Esperance Plains, Jarrah Forest and Swan Coastal Plain biogeographic regions of south-western Western Australia. It is also naturalised in other parts of that state and also in South Australia and Tasmania.

Use in horticulture
A cultivar known as Kennedia nigricans 'Minstrel' was registered with the Australian Cultivar Registration Authority by Goldup Nursery of Mount Evelyn, Victoria in September 1985. This cultivar was selected from a batch of seedlings in 1983 and has a pale colouration instead of the yellow, which appears almost white.

This climber is noted for its vigour and can be used to cover embankments or unsightly structures. 
The species is adapted to a range of soils and prefers a sunny position. It is resistant to drought and has some frost tolerance. The species can be propagated by scarified seed or cuttings of semi-mature growth, while the cultivar requires propagation from cuttings to remain true to type.

References

nigricans
Fabales of Australia
Rosids of Western Australia
Garden plants
Plants described in 1835